Stewart D. Ashby Jr. (born May 9, 1973) better known by his stage name Big Scoob is an American rapper from Kansas City, Missouri, who records for Strange Music.

Early life
Big Scoob spent his late adolescence and part of his early adulthood involved with gangs in his native Kansas City, Missouri. Rap music eventually provided a path out of the lifestyle.

Musical career

Early career
Along with fellow Kansas City natives Tech N9ne, Bakarri, and Txx Will, he formed the 57th Street Rogue Dog Villians, a group that released a handful of albums during the late 1990s and early 2000s. Frustrated with the industry, Scoob left music and focused on raising his daughters.

Return to music and signing to Strange Music
After a few years of dormancy, Big Scoob was convinced by Tech N9ne to return to the music industry. On February 7, 2009, it was announced on Tech N9ne's official website that Big Scoob had signed to his independent record label, Strange Music.

Releases
On September 15, 2009, Big Scoob released his debut studio album Monsterifik through Strange Music. The album was released under the "Tech N9ne Presents" banner, making it the second album to have this introduction banner following Krizz Kaliko's debut album. Features on this album include 8Ball & MJG, B-Legit, Johnny Richter of the Kottonmouth Kings, 1 Ton of Potluck and Irv Da Phenom, along with Strange Music labelmates Tech N9ne, Krizz Kaliko, former Strange Music artists Kutt Calhoun Skatterman, and 57th Street Rogue Dog Villains members Bakarri (as Mr. Whitebear) & Txx Will. The album debuted number 67 on the Billboard Top R&B/Hip-Hop Albums.

Big Scoob released his sophomore album Damn Fool on May 3, 2011. Guests on the album include Glasses Malone, Bumpy Knuckles, Chillest Illest, Krizz Kaliko, Tech N9ne, Messy Marv, T-Nutty, Skatterman and Jay Rock. The album debuted number 49 on the Billboard Top R&B/Hip-Hop Albums and number 24 on the Billboard Top Rap Albums.

On September 20, 2011, Big Scoob released the No Filter EP. The EP features Kutt Calhoun, BG Bulletwound, and Irv Da Phenom.

It was stated by Tech N9ne in an interview with The Source that Big Scoob no longer wished to make any more projects because "these kids don't understand what he's talking about." However, he still appears on other rappers' albums, including Tech N9ne's albums. After the release of Tech N9ne's sixth Collabos album Strangeulation Vol. II, Big Scoob confirmed that he is currently working on his next album. He stated in a Twitter post that his last two albums had too many outside sources, including Tech N9ne's fans, the streets, and Strange Music, thus making them "mediocre."

Discography

Albums

with 57th Street Rogue Dog

EPs

Mixtapes

Singles

Music videos

Guest appearances

References

External links
 Big Scoob's Official Site
 Big Scoob's Myspace

African-American male rappers
American male rappers
Living people
Rappers from Kansas City, Missouri
Underground rappers
Bloods
Gangsta rappers
1973 births
21st-century American rappers
21st-century American male musicians
21st-century African-American musicians
20th-century African-American people